Pedro Peláez y Sebastián (June 29, 1812 – June 3, 1863) was a Filipino Catholic priest who favored the rights for Filipino clergy during the 19th century. He was diocesan administrator of the Archdiocese of Manila for a brief period of time. In the early 19th century, Pelaez advocated for the secularization of Filipino priests and is considered the "Godfather of the Philippine Revolution." His cause towards beatification has been initiated; he has the title "Servant of God."

Life
Pelaez was born on June 29, 1812, to Jose Pelaez, the Spanish alcalde (mayor) of Laguna and his wife Josefa Sebastian, a Filipino from Manila. When both of his parents died in 1823, he was taken in by the Dominican friars in Manila. They sent him to study at the Colegio de San Juan de Letran where he completed a Bachelor of Arts degree. He then enrolled at the University of Santo Tomas to finish his studies for the priesthood. Pelaez studied under Francisco Ayala.

Pelaez was ordained in 1837. Although Pelaez decided to become a secular priest, he maintained close ties with the Dominican his whole life. He served at the  Metropolitan Cathedral of the Immaculate Conception. A gifted theologian, he became Diocesan administrator of the Manila Archdiocese.

From 1836 to 1839, he taught philosophy at the Colegio de San Jose and later taught various subjects at the University of Santo Tomas from 1843 to 1861.

Defense of local clergy
In the mid-19th century, the Philippines was still a Spanish colony. Travel to the Philippines from Spain became easier due to the Suez Canal. An increase of Peninsulares from the Iberian Peninsula threatened the secularization of the Philippine churches. In state affairs, the Criollos, known locally as Insulares (lit. "islanders") were displaced from government positions by the Peninsulares, whom the Insulares regarded as foreigners.

In 1849, a royal decree removed a few parishes from the secular clergy, which was mainly Filipinos, and gave those parishes to the Recollects and Dominicans. According to Peláez, the parishes had been successfully managed for the past eighty years and the parishioners were happy. Along with Father Mariano Gomez, Pelaez started organizing activities calling for the return of control of Philippine parishes to Filipino seculars. This can be seen as the first signs of nationalist awakening. 

Seeking to have the royal decree cancelled or changed, Peláez published anonymously a long formal protest titled "El Clero Filipino" (The Filipino Clergy) in a Spanish newspaper, El Clamor Público, in 1850. The seculars lost further parishes when the Jesuits returned to the Philippines in 1861. Together with Francisco Gaínza, Peláez founded El Católico Filipino, the first Catholic newspaper in the Philippines. With his knowledge of canon law, Peláez wrote against this policy; nor did he hesitate to criticize the clergy both secular and regular priests, Spanish or Filipinos when approriate.

In 1863, Pelaez died during the earthquake in Manila as the Manila Cathedral collapsed and was heavily damaged.

See also
Mariano Gomez
Philippine revolts against Spain

References

Sources

 

Spanish emigrants to the Philippines
Filipino Servants of God
1812 births
1863 deaths
People from Laguna (province)
19th-century Roman Catholic archbishops in the Philippines
Deaths in earthquakes
Natural disaster deaths in the Philippines
Colegio de San Juan de Letran alumni
19th-century venerated Christians
University of Santo Tomas alumni